Luigi Mauro Cichero (16 October 1951 – 20 January 2019) was a footballer who played as a central defender. Born in Italy, he represented Venezuela internationally. He competed in the men's tournament at the 1980 Summer Olympics.

Early life
Cichero was born in Genoa, Italy and spent his early life there until he was 14, when his family moved to Venezuela.

Playing career
Cichero played professionally in Venezuela for Deportivo Italia, Unión Deportiva Canarias, and ULA Mérida during the 1970s. He made a name for himself in Venezuela thanks to his skill, resulting in the opportunity to go to Italy and went on trial with AC Milan. While he did not make the team, he ended up moving to Serie B club Grosseto.

He also represented the Venezuela national team. His first appearances came at the seven team 1980 Olympic qualifying tournament. They came in 4th did not originally qualify for the 1980 Summer Olympics, however, Argentina was part of the 1980 Summer Olympics boycott, thereby vacating their spot, allowing Venezuela to compete in the Olympic football tournament, where he played three games and served as team captain. He also continued to represent the national team afterwards.

Post-playing career
After retiring from professional football, he began his coaching career. He began working at the football school of the Colegio Campo Alegre de las Mercedes in Caracas, Venezuela and became a professor of Sport Sciences at a school and established a football program there. In 1999, he moved to Norman, Oklahoma to become the Director of Coaching for the Norman Youth Soccer Association. In 2003, he was named as the head coach of the St. Gregory's University men's soccer team in Oklahoma.

He died on 20 January 2019 in the United States, following a battle with cancer.

Personal life
He is the father of professional football players Alejandro Cichero, Gabriel Cichero, and Mauro Cichero.

References

External links
 

1951 births
2019 deaths
Footballers from Genoa
Venezuelan footballers
Italian footballers
Association football central defenders
Venezuela international footballers
Italian emigrants to Venezuela
Olympic footballers of Venezuela
Footballers at the 1980 Summer Olympics
F.C. Grosseto S.S.D. players